Podmaleniec  is a village in the administrative district of Gmina Staszów, within Staszów County, Świętokrzyskie Voivodeship, in south-central Poland.

The village has a population of  521.

Demography 
According to the 2002 Poland census, there were 483 people residing in Podmaleniec village, of whom 47.8% were male and 52.2% were female. In the village, the population was spread out, with 24.2% under the age of 18, 35.8% from 18 to 44, 21.1% from 45 to 64, and 18.6% who were 65 years of age or older.
 Figure 1. Population pyramid of village in 2002 — by age group and sex

References

Podmaleniec